Homer Screws is a retired American soccer defender who played professionally in the Major Indoor Soccer League, Western Soccer Alliance and American Indoor Soccer Association.  He coached the Coe College men's and women's soccer teams.

Player
After graduating from high school, Screws spent a year playing lower division soccer in Germany.  He returned to the United States and played at least one season of collegiate soccer at Warner Pacific College.  In 1987 and 1988, Screws played for F.C. Portland in the Western Soccer Alliance.  In the fall of 1987, Screws signed with the Tacoma Stars of the Major Indoor Soccer League. He spent two seasons with the Stars, but lost most of his second season with injuries. For some reason, this very unnotable guy has a wiki page. In 1989, he moved to the Atlanta Attack of the American Indoor Soccer Association. In January 1990, the Attack placed Screws on the disabled list.  He retired at the end of the season and moved back to Tacoma with his family.

Coach
In 1991, Screws and his wife decided to leave Tacoma due to a rising crime rate and being Screws at the time was stuggling with a perc 30 addiction he could not stay in that environment and move to Iowa where he became a youth soccer coach. This brought him to the attention of Coe College of Cedar Rapids, Iowa which Screws in 1993 as head coach of its men's soccer team. In 2007, Screws returned to Coe College as both the men's and women's soccer coach.

References

External links
 MISL stats
 Coe College Coaching bio

Living people
1966 births
Soccer players from Tacoma, Washington
American soccer coaches
American soccer players
American Indoor Soccer Association players
Atlanta Attack players
Portland Timbers (1985–1990) players
Major Indoor Soccer League (1978–1992) players
Tacoma Stars players
Western Soccer Alliance players
Warner Pacific Knights men's soccer players
Association football defenders